DD Smash was a New Zealand pop/rock band formed in 1980 by Dave Dobbyn after the breakup of Th' Dudes. The band briefly used the name "Dave Dobbyn's Divers" until drummer Peter Warren came up with "DD Smash". Dobbyn says the name "seemed to say everything about what we were into, which was having a jolly good time and blasting out music."

History
DD Smash formed in 1980. By late '81, DD Smash signed a recording deal and immediately set about recording their debut album, with Ian Morris as producer.

DD Smash released their debut album in 1982. Titled Cool Bananas it debuted at number 1 in New Zealand and was certified triple gold. 

DD Smash split during the mid-1980s when Dave Dobbyn began recording by himself.

In 2015, as part of the 40th anniversary celebrations of the New Zealand Music Charts, Recorded Music NZ honoured DD Smash's debut album Cool Bananas as being the first album by a New Zealand artist to debut at No.1 on the album chart.

Members
 Dave Dobbyn (guitar, vocals, songwriter)
 Andrew Clouston (saxophone), 
 Peter (Rooda) Warren (drums), 
 Rob Guy (Revox) (guitar)

Discography

Albums

Singles

RIANZ Awards 
The New Zealand Music Awards are awarded annually by the RIANZ in New Zealand.

See also
 Music of New Zealand

References

External links
 DD Smash on muzic net
 DD Smash Profile - NZMusic.com
 DD Smash Forum - NZMusic.com
 1986 Chris Bourke article on the band and the breakup

APRA Award winners
New Zealand pop rock groups